Liza Balkan is a Canadian actress, dancer, director, teacher and writer.

Career
She received Toronto's Dora Mavor Moore Award for her performance in Still the Night (Theatre Passe Muraille/Tova Entertainment/Tapestry/National Tour). She is also known as the voice actress for Amy Mizuno from the third and fourth seasons of the English adaptation of Sailor Moon.

On the silver screen, she had a role in Asghar Massombagi's Khaled (2001) and appeared in Atom Egoyan's critically acclaimed drama Remember (2015), portraying the daughter-in-law of Christopher Plummer's protagonist in the latter.

Balkan teaches at the University of Windsor, located in Windsor, Ontario.

Directing credits
 Opera Brief's 6 & 7 (Tapestry New Opera Works)
 Skylight and Trying (Persephone Theatre)
 Half an Hour (Shaw Festival Director's Project)
 Bunnicula (Theatre Athena)
 Orchids (Marquis Ent.)
 Good Woman of Setzuan
 Enemies (premiere, Ryerson Theatre School )
 Pavlov's Brother (Toronto Fringe Festival)

Performances
 Sylvia (Belfry Theatre)
 It's All True (Great Canadian Theatre Company)
 The Winter's Tale (National Arts Centre)
 The Stronger Variations (Theatre Rusticle/Harbourfront)
 Golda's Balcony (Winnipeg Jewish Theatre)
 West Side Story (Kennedy Center, Washington, D.C.)

Voice roles
 Sailor Moon (Sailor Mercury/Amy Mizuno)

See also

 List of Canadian actors
 List of Canadian directors
 List of people from Windsor, Ontario

References

External links
 
 Official Web site: www.lizabalkan.com
 

Canadian film actresses
Canadian stage actresses
Canadian television actresses
Canadian theatre directors
Canadian voice actresses
Dora Mavor Moore Award winners
Living people
Academic staff of University of Windsor
21st-century Canadian actresses
20th-century births
Year of birth missing (living people)
Place of birth missing (living people)